The Central constituency (No.216) is a Russian legislative constituency in Saint Petersburg. It covers Central Saint Petersburg since 2016. In 1995-2007 Central Saint Petersburg was split between now disestablished Admiralteysky constituency (centred on the Admiralteysky District) and Central constituency (centred on the Tsentranly District with the latter also taking some districts to the east.

Members elected

Election results

1993

|-
! colspan=2 style="background-color:#E9E9E9;text-align:left;vertical-align:top;" |Candidate
! style="background-color:#E9E9E9;text-align:left;vertical-align:top;" |Party
! style="background-color:#E9E9E9;text-align:right;" |Votes
! style="background-color:#E9E9E9;text-align:right;" |%
|-
|style="background-color:"|
|align=left|Aleksandr Nevzorov
|align=left|Independent
|
|27.01%
|-
|style="background-color:"|
|align=left|Yury Vdovin
|align=left|Independent
| -
|25.60%
|-
| colspan="5" style="background-color:#E9E9E9;"|
|- style="font-weight:bold"
| colspan="3" style="text-align:left;" | Total
| 
| 100%
|-
| colspan="5" style="background-color:#E9E9E9;"|
|- style="font-weight:bold"
| colspan="4" |Source:
|
|}

1995

|-
! colspan=2 style="background-color:#E9E9E9;text-align:left;vertical-align:top;" |Candidate
! style="background-color:#E9E9E9;text-align:left;vertical-align:top;" |Party
! style="background-color:#E9E9E9;text-align:right;" |Votes
! style="background-color:#E9E9E9;text-align:right;" |%
|-
|style="background-color:"|
|align=left|Pyotr Shelishch
|align=left|Independent
|
|20.99%
|-
|style="background-color:#FE4801"|
|align=left|Arkady Kramarev
|align=left|Pamfilova–Gurov–Lysenko
|
|14.49%
|-
|style="background-color:"|
|align=left|Nikita Ananov
|align=left|Independent
|
|11.25%
|-
|style="background-color:"|
|align=left|Aleksey Vorontsov
|align=left|Independent
|
|7.88%
|-
|style="background-color:"|
|align=left|Yury Shutov
|align=left|Independent
|
|7.59%
|-
|style="background-color:#D50000"|
|align=left|Yevgeny Kozlov
|align=left|Communists and Working Russia - for the Soviet Union
|
|5.85%
|-
|style="background-color:#00A200"|
|align=left|Nikolay Arzhannikov
|align=left|Transformation of the Fatherland
|
|5.17%
|-
|style="background-color:"|
|align=left|Mikhail Kiselyov
|align=left|Independent
|
|3.13%
|-
|style="background-color:#2C299A"|
|align=left|Anatoly Yemets
|align=left|Congress of Russian Communities
|
|2.98%
|-
|style="background-color:"|
|align=left|Valery Sokolov
|align=left|Independent
|
|2.38%
|-
|style="background-color:"|
|align=left|Leonid Rogozin
|align=left|Independent
|
|0.62%
|-
|style="background-color:"|
|align=left|Andrey Sabor
|align=left|Independent
|
|0.59%
|-
|style="background-color:#000000"|
|colspan=2 |against all
|
|14.63%
|-
| colspan="5" style="background-color:#E9E9E9;"|
|- style="font-weight:bold"
| colspan="3" style="text-align:left;" | Total
| 
| 100%
|-
| colspan="5" style="background-color:#E9E9E9;"|
|- style="font-weight:bold"
| colspan="4" |Source:
|
|}

1999

|-
! colspan=2 style="background-color:#E9E9E9;text-align:left;vertical-align:top;" |Candidate
! style="background-color:#E9E9E9;text-align:left;vertical-align:top;" |Party
! style="background-color:#E9E9E9;text-align:right;" |Votes
! style="background-color:#E9E9E9;text-align:right;" |%
|-
|style="background-color:"|
|align=left|Pyotr Shelishch (incumbent)
|align=left|Independent
|
|18.30%
|-
|style="background-color:"|
|align=left|Anatoly Sobchak
|align=left|Independent
|
|16.46%
|-
|style="background-color:#3B9EDF"|
|align=left|Andrey Ananov
|align=left|Fatherland – All Russia
|
|15.54%
|-
|style="background-color:"|
|align=left|Yelena Drapeko
|align=left|Communist Party
|
|11.92%
|-
|style="background-color:"|
|align=left|Vyacheslav Shevchenko
|align=left|Independent
|
|6.65%
|-
|style="background-color:"|
|align=left|Yury Shutov
|align=left|Independent
|
|6.57%
|-
|style="background-color:"|
|align=left|Lyudmila Yermolayeva
|align=left|Liberal Democratic Party
|
|4.04%
|-
|style="background-color:"|
|align=left|Faig Askerov
|align=left|Independent
|
|1.45%
|-
|style="background-color:#CC0000"|
|align=left|Mikhail Korobkov
|align=left|Social-Democrats
|
|0.60%
|-
|style="background-color:#000000"|
|colspan=2 |against all
|
|17.37%
|-
| colspan="5" style="background-color:#E9E9E9;"|
|- style="font-weight:bold"
| colspan="3" style="text-align:left;" | Total
| 
| 100%
|-
| colspan="5" style="background-color:#E9E9E9;"|
|- style="font-weight:bold"
| colspan="4" |Source:
|
|}

2003

|-
! colspan=2 style="background-color:#E9E9E9;text-align:left;vertical-align:top;" |Candidate
! style="background-color:#E9E9E9;text-align:left;vertical-align:top;" |Party
! style="background-color:#E9E9E9;text-align:right;" |Votes
! style="background-color:#E9E9E9;text-align:right;" |%
|-
|style="background-color:"|
|align=left|Pyotr Shelishch (incumbent)
|align=left|Independent
|
|29.66%
|-
|style="background-color:"|
|align=left|Nikita Ananov
|align=left|Independent
|
|13.82%
|-
|style="background-color:"|
|align=left|Yury Shutov
|align=left|Independent
|
|7.74%
|-
|style="background-color:"|
|align=left|Ivan Sabilo
|align=left|Communist Party
|
|6.66%
|-
|style="background-color:"|
|align=left|Valery Papshev
|align=left|Independent
|
|6.01%
|-
|style="background-color:"|
|align=left|Andrey Sharonov
|align=left|Independent
|
|5.52%
|-
|style="background-color:"|
|align=left|Aleksey Maksimov
|align=left|Independent
|
|5.24%
|-
|style="background-color:#14589F"|
|align=left|Nikolay Nazha
|align=left|Development of Enterprise
|
|3.81%
|-
|style="background-color:"|
|align=left|Sergey Tikhomirov
|align=left|Liberal Democratic Party
|
|3.48%
|-
|style="background-color:#000000"|
|colspan=2 |against all
|
|16.82%
|-
| colspan="5" style="background-color:#E9E9E9;"|
|- style="font-weight:bold"
| colspan="3" style="text-align:left;" | Total
| 
| 100%
|-
| colspan="5" style="background-color:#E9E9E9;"|
|- style="font-weight:bold"
| colspan="4" |Source:
|
|}

2016

|-
! colspan=2 style="background-color:#E9E9E9;text-align:left;vertical-align:top;" |Candidate
! style="background-color:#E9E9E9;text-align:leftt;vertical-align:top;" |Party
! style="background-color:#E9E9E9;text-align:right;" |Votes
! style="background-color:#E9E9E9;text-align:right;" |%
|-
|style="background-color:"|
|align=left|Vladimir Bortko
|align=left|Communist Party
|
|23.88%
|-
|style="background:"| 
|align=left|Maksim Reznik
|align=left|Party of Growth
|
|16.82%
|-
|style="background-color:"|
|align=left|Boris Paykin
|align=left|Liberal Democratic Party
|
|16.08%
|-
|style="background:"| 
|align=left|Nikolay Rybakov
|align=left|Yabloko
|
|13.26%
|-
|style="background-color:"|
|align=left|Sergey Popov
|align=left|A Just Russia
|
|10.11%
|-
|style="background:"| 
|align=left|Arkady Chaplygin
|align=left|People's Freedom Party
|
|3.38%
|-
|style="background-color:"|
|align=left|Aleksandr Startsev
|align=left|The Greens
|
|3.38%
|-
|style="background-color:"|
|align=left|Pavel Spivachevsky
|align=left|Rodina
|
|3.29%
|-
|style="background:"| 
|align=left|Galina Kirichenko
|align=left|Civic Platform
|
|2.43%
|-
|style="background:"| 
|align=left|Vitaly Glavatsky
|align=left|Communists of Russia
|
|2.22%
|-
| colspan="5" style="background-color:#E9E9E9;"|
|- style="font-weight:bold"
| colspan="3" style="text-align:left;" | Total
| 
| 100%
|-
| colspan="5" style="background-color:#E9E9E9;"|
|- style="font-weight:bold"
| colspan="4" |Source:
|
|}

2021

|-
! colspan=2 style="background-color:#E9E9E9;text-align:left;vertical-align:top;" |Candidate
! style="background-color:#E9E9E9;text-align:left;vertical-align:top;" |Party
! style="background-color:#E9E9E9;text-align:right;" |Votes
! style="background-color:#E9E9E9;text-align:right;" |%
|-
|style="background-color: " |
|align=left|Sergey Solovyov
|align=left|United Russia
|
|34.03%
|-
|style="background-color:"|
|align=left|Boris Vishnevsky
|align=left|Yabloko
|
|23.05%
|-
|style="background-color:"|
|align=left|Mikhail Bogdanov
|align=left|A Just Russia — For Truth
|
|7.05%
|-
|style="background-color:"|
|align=left|Gennady Denisov
|align=left|Communist Party
|
|6.87%
|-
|style="background-color: "|
|align=left|Aleksey Kovalyov
|align=left|Party of Growth
|
|6.83%
|-
|style="background-color: "|
|align=left|Darya Sadovskaya
|align=left|New People
|
|5.49%
|-
|style="background-color:"|
|align=left|Yekaterina Lebedeva
|align=left|Liberal Democratic Party
|
|3.55%
|-
|style="background-color: "|
|align=left|Gennady Detkov
|align=left|Party of Pensioners
|
|2.98%
|-
|style="background-color:"|
|align=left|Boris Vishnevsky
|align=left|The Greens
|
|2.06%
|-
|style="background-color:"|
|align=left|Gennady Makoyev
|align=left|Communists of Russia
|
|1.67%
|-
|style="background-color:"|
|align=left|Andrey Ivanov
|align=left|Rodina
|
|1.37%
|-
|style="background-color:"|
|align=left|Aleksey Terekhov
|align=left|Green Alternative
|
|0.84%
|-
|style="background:"| 
|align=left|Sergey Ivanov
|align=left|Civic Platform
|
|0.54%
|-
| colspan="5" style="background-color:#E9E9E9;"|
|- style="font-weight:bold"
| colspan="3" style="text-align:left;" | Total
| 
| 100%
|-
| colspan="5" style="background-color:#E9E9E9;"|
|- style="font-weight:bold"
| colspan="4" |Source:
|
|}

Notes

References

Russian legislative constituencies
Politics of Saint Petersburg